Enkenbach-Alsenborn is a municipality in the district of Kaiserslautern, in Rhineland-Palatinate, Germany. It is situated on the northern edge of the Palatinate forest, approx. 10 km north-east of Kaiserslautern. Enkenbach-Alsenborn is also the seat of the Verbandsgemeinde ("collective municipality"), also named Enkenbach-Alsenborn.

Geography
The municipality consists of the local villages of Enkenbach and Alsenborn.  Before officially combining on 7 June 1969, the two villages worked very closely throughout their history to include a common coat of arms  until 1795, a common mayor until 1825 and a common forest area until 1832.

Neighbouring municipalities are - in a clockwise direction - Neuhemsbach, Sippersfeld, Kerzenheim, Ramsen (Pfalz), Wattenheim, Fischbach (Kaiserslautern district), Kaiserslautern and Mehlingen.

History
Findings from the young stone age and mounds from the Iron Age indicate that the area was already populated in early-historical time.

Expansion
With favorable traffic levels and the connection to the railway in the year 1871 with the opening of Enkenbach station on the Alsenz Valley Railway, as well as the establishment of industry in the Kaiserslautern area, led to the total population of the municipality increasing despite strong emigration out of present-day Germany.  Due to this population increase, Enkenbach-Alsenborn evolved from a farming community to the municipality it is today.

Population
1800: 1,095
1900: 3,326
1975: 6,900
1996: 7,323

Sons and daughters of the community 

 Wilhelm Mayerr (1874-1923), politician (CENTER, BVP)
 Wilhelm Müller (1890-1957), politician (KPD)

References

Municipalities in Rhineland-Palatinate
Palatinate Forest
Kaiserslautern (district)